Roslindale is a primarily residential neighborhood of Boston, Massachusetts, bordered by Jamaica Plain, Hyde Park, West Roxbury and Mattapan. 
It is served by an MBTA Commuter Rail line, several MBTA bus lines and the MBTA Orange Line in nearby Jamaica Plain.  Roslindale has its own branch of the Boston Public Library, the neighborhood is covered by Boston Police District E-5 in West Roxbury, Boston EMS Ambulance 17 is stationed in Roslindale, and the Boston Fire Department has a station on Canterbury Street which houses Ladder 16, Engine 53 & District Chief 12. Roslindale's original Engine Company 45, was deactivated on April 10, 1981, due to budget cuts. Roslindale was once called the "garden suburb" of Boston. The portion of the Arnold Arboretum south of Bussey Street is located in Roslindale.

Six miles south-southwest of downtown Boston, Roslindale was originally part of the town of Roxbury. In 1851, current day Jamaica Plain, Roslindale and West Roxbury seceded from Roxbury. The area voted in 1873 to be annexed to the City of Boston.

History
In the 1860s, the area was called South Street Crossing, due to the railroad's intersection with South Street.  However, when the community applied for a post office district of its own, the name "South Street Crossing" proved to be unacceptable to the government.  The name Roslindale was suggested by John Pierce, a well-traveled member of the community, who told the assembled citizens that the area reminded him of the historic town of Roslin, Scotland, outside Edinburgh. Pierce thought the area was like a dale because of the hills surrounding it. Thus the combination of "Roslin" and "dale" was submitted to the United States Postal Service and the name Roslindale was formally established.

Roslindale grew residentially as a classic streetcar suburb. The railway was built after the American Civil War, and spawned a new round of commercial development. Roslindale saw steady growth in its residential population, beginning in the 1880s, with the introduction of the horse-drawn street railway service between Forest Hills and Dedham.

The Forest Hills disaster, a train wreck, occurred in Roslindale on March 14, 1887. A Boston & Providence Railroad train consisting of a locomotive and nine passenger cars inbound from Dedham to Boston with over 200 passengers, was passing over a bridge at Bussey Street, in the current Arnold Arboretum, when the bridge collapsed causing the rear five cars to pile up on top of each other, killing twenty-three and injuring over one hundred. This is considered one of the first major rail catastrophes in the country, and contributed to the widespread inspection of train bridges across the U.S.

In the 1920s, Roslindale Square assumed the configuration it has today, with tree-lined Adams Park at its center.  Roslindale falls in a crease between several other Boston neighborhoods and the parts of Roslindale adjacent to these surrounding neighborhoods take on the characteristics of those neighborhoods.  For example, the western part of Roslindale blends seamlessly with West Roxbury's one and two family residences and tree lined streets; and Roslindale's northern area consists of dense two and three family residences amidst light industrial buildings similar to the adjacent Stony Brook corridor in Jamaica Plain.

Prior to the rise of suburban shopping malls in the 1970s, the Roslindale business district, Roslindale Square, was a major shopping district for the city of Boston, with department stores, showrooms, food markets, and a movie theatre. After suffering years of vacant storefronts and increased vandalism during the 1970s, 1980s and 1990s.  Roslindale Square enjoys a renewed success today as a local shopping district, which includes the restored Roslindale Substation and the rising number of new apartment buildings. Additionally, since the 1980s, the Roslindale Village Main Street has enjoyed success in creating a community in Roslindale Square, running several events including the Roslindale Farmers' Market and the annual tree lighting in Adams Park.

Demographics
Roslindale is a diverse neighborhood—according to the 2020 census, the racial makeup of its inhabitants was 45.7% Non-Hispanic White, 20.6% Non-Hispanic Black or African-American, 25.1% Hispanic or Latino, 3.5% Asian or Pacific Islander, and 5.2% identified as other or multiple races.

Notable people

Joseph Abboud
Paul Francis Anderson
Mark Bavis
Martha Cahoon
Steve DeOssie
Stephen Davenport
Walter Alden Dyer
George Fair
Charlotte Gilbertson
Martha Goodway
T. Vincent Learson
Skip Lockwood
Brian McGrory
Mary McGrory
Charlie Rugg
Slaine
Esoteric
Paul Sally
Stephen Soldz
Marian Walsh
Billy West
Michelle Wu

Education

Elementary schools 

 Sacred Heart School
 John D Philbrick
 George H Conley
 Charles Sumner
 Mozart
 Phineas Bates
 Dennis C Haley
 Children's Learning Center
 Brooke Charter School

Middle schools 

 Sacred Heart School
 Edward Brooke Charter School
 Washington Irving Middle School

High schools 

 St. Clare High School  [closed - building is now the Edward Brooke Middle School]

In popular culture
Roslindale is depicted in the 2017 film, Last Night in Rozzie

See also
 District 5, Boston

References

Further reading 
 Sammarco, Anthony Mitchell, Roslindale: Then & Now, Arcadia Publishing, 2003

External links
 The Arnold Arboretum of Harvard University
 Roslindale, Massachusetts Historical Society

Neighborhoods in Boston
Streetcar suburbs